Goodpasture is a surname. Notable people with the surname include:

Benton Cordell Goodpasture (1895–1977), preacher and writer in the Churches of Christ
Carll Goodpasture (born 1943), American cytogenetics expert, entomologist, and photographer
Ernest William Goodpasture (1886–1960), American pathologist and physician, after whom Goodpasture syndrome is named

See also